Josh Caulfield (born 9 June 1997) is a professional Rugby Union player. He plays in the second row for the Wasps on loan from Cornish Pirates.

He made his first appearance for the Chiefs in the Anglo-Welsh Cup against the Cardiff Blues in November 2016.

He has also appeared for his hometown club Taunton Titans.

At international level he has represented the England U18s and was part of the U20s squad at the Junior World Championships and the Junior six nations.

Personal life
His brother Jake Caulfield was also a professional rugby union player for Bath Rugby and Ulster Rugby before he dropped down the leagues and quit.

References

1997 births
Living people
Rugby union locks